Jorian Nicole Baucom (born August 4, 1996) is an American professional soccer player who most recently played as a forward for the North Carolina Courage  of the National Women's Soccer League.

Early life
Born in Scottsdale, Arizona, Baucom began her career with Sereno Soccer Club in 2005 before joining SC del Sol in 2012. She also represented her high school soccer team, Pinnacle High School, where she led them to the state final in 2014 after scoring a team-high 26 goals.

In 2014, Baucom enrolled at Louisiana State University where she played college soccer for the LSU Tigers. She made her collegiate debut on August 22, 2014, against the Troy Trojans where she scored her first goal after just 48 seconds. She finished her first season 8 goals in 20 matches, being awarded as the SEC Freshman of the Year. She played two more seasons with the Tigers before transferring to the University of Colorado and playing with the Colorado Buffaloes. She sat out the 2017 season in order to recover from knee surgery during the offseason before returning as a red shirt senior in 2018, scoring 12 goals, the second most in Buffaloes history.

Club career
On June 20, 2019, Baucom signed with National Women's Soccer League club Houston Dash as a national team replacement player. She spent a couple months with the Dash before signing with Czech Women's First League club AC Sparta Prague. She made her international club debut for Sparta in the UEFA Women's Champions League on September 11, 2019, against Breiðablik, coming on as a substitute during a 3–2 defeat.

On October 8, 2020, Baucom signed with Frauen-Bundesliga club MSV Duisburg. She made her debut for the club on October 10 against Turbine Potsdam, starting and scoring in the 37th minute of a 3–2 defeat.

Racing Louisville, 2021
On April 5, 2021, Baucom joined National Women's Soccer League club Racing Louisville after training with the club during pre-season. She made her professional debut for the club on April 10, 2021, against Orlando Pride, coming on as a 78th minute substitute in a 2–2 draw.

North Carolina Courage, 2022
On December 14, 2021, Baucom joined the North Carolina Courage after being picked from the waiver wire. After making six appearances for the Courage, the team waived her on August 3, 2022, so she could play outside of the NWSL.

International career
Baucom has trained with or represented the United States at the under-15, under-16, under-19, under-20 sides.

Career statistics

References

External links
 Profile at Racing Louisville
 
 

1996 births
Living people
Soccer players from Scottsdale, Arizona
American women's soccer players
Women's association football forwards
LSU Tigers women's soccer players
Houston Dash players
MSV Duisburg (women) players
Racing Louisville FC players
Frauen-Bundesliga players
American expatriate women's soccer players
Expatriate women's footballers in the Czech Republic
Colorado Buffaloes women's soccer players
American expatriate sportspeople in the Czech Republic
American expatriate soccer players in Germany
African-American women's soccer players
21st-century African-American sportspeople
National Women's Soccer League players
21st-century African-American women
North Carolina Courage players
AC Sparta Praha (women) players